Pukyong National University (PKNU) is a national university in Busan, South Korea, formed in 1996. The university has two campuses, Daeyeon-dong and Yongdang-dong, situated near the coastal district of Nam-gu. PKNU has a traditional focus on fisheries sciences and other maritime fields, and has extensive facilities for Marine and Technology studies. 

The school's symbol mascot is anthropomorphic Moby Dick, "Baek Kyung-i". The school name was changed through a vote in August 2021.

History
PKNU was formed in 1996 from the merger of two national universities with long histories, the National Fisheries University of Busan, established in 1941, and the Busan National University of Technology, which was established in 1924. 

Historically, Daeyeon-dong was a small fishing village populated by anchovy fishermen. In the early years of the 20th century these fishermen found their products in high demand and they became quite wealthy. They used the money to purchase what is now the Daeyeon-dong campus site and donated it to the government, under the condition that it be used to establish a training centre for their industry. During the Korean War, the Daeyeon campus was used as an airfield by the U.S. Air Force. Local residents constructed a large Dol-Jip "stone house" for the commanding officers and pilots. Today this building is used as a student cafeteria.

Before Integration (~1996)

National Fisheries University of Busan 
The National Fisheries University of Busan was the only higher education institution located in South Gyeongsang Province in Korea under Japanese rule and 5 years after liberation. The other higher education institutes were located in Keijō(4 academies), North Korea region, and South regions including Keijō Imperial University. In 1944, it was renamed Pusan Fisheries University and established Fisheries college in Shimonoseki, Yamaguchi (city). 

On 15 May 1946, when Pusan National University was established, it was integrated into the Department of Fisheries. When it came to July 1947, it became an independent university and was promoted to National Fisheries University of Pusan. Immediately after 16 May 1961, it was forcibly integrated into PNU due to external pressure from the government but separated again from PNU in 1964.

On 6 November 1986, the Department of Fisheries and Oceanography, Science and Engineering, and Social Science were established, and on 1 March 1990, it was promoted to a comprehensive university and reorganized into nine departments (University of Fisheries and Maritime Affairs, College of Natural Sciences, College of Engineering, and College of Humanities and Social Sciences and more). On 1 March 1996, 6 universities and 39 departments were established, 29 master's courses were established in graduate schools, 23 doctoral courses, 4 majors in graduate schools of education, and 16 master's courses in graduate schools of industry.

Busan National University of Technology 
The university was established in Bosu-dong, Jung-gu on 5 May 1924, in the name of Pusan Public Industrial Continuation School (two-year system). The Temporary Special Act on Education and Education was abolished in 1963, which increased the need for higher education. On 29 September 1973, the school was approved for establishment as the National Pusan Technical School (5-year system). 

7 December 1983, eight departments were established, approved for promotion and reorganization as Pusan Open University (4-year system). On 4 May 1988, the school name was changed to Pusan National University of Technology. 

On 6 March 1990, the Graduate School of Industrial Technology was newly established and five departments were opened. On 24 February 1993, the school name was changed to Pusan National University of Technology, after being promoted to a general university. On 1 March 1996, Pusan National University of Technology was integrated into PKNU.

After Integration 
On 6 July 1996, Pusan National University of Fisheries and Pusan National University of Technology were integrated and established with approval for the establishment of Pukyong National University (58 departments under 6 universities), with 31 master's courses, four master's courses in education, and 31 master's courses in the industry. The school name change was discussed from the days of Pusan National University of Fisheries, which was promoted to a general university before the integration, but the school name Pusan National University of Fisheries was used until it was integrated without approval from the Ministry of Education at the time.

In 1996, the International Exchange Center and the European Information Center were established, and in 1997, the University Fisheries Science Research Institute Vancouver was established, and in 1998, a joint laboratory in Daeyeon Campus was established. In 1999, the BK21 Regional Leading Machinery Industry Human Resources Development Project Group was established, and the Pukyong National University Lifelong Education Center was established.

At present, there are around 26,000 students and 544 professors across the two campuses, which together cover 673,899 m2. There are three large libraries, two in Daeyeon Dong and one in Yongdang Dong. The campuses are about 4 km apart. A free shuttle bus connects them in about 10–15 minutes.

Although primarily a fisheries university, PKNU has six colleges including a large humanities and social sciences department, four graduate programs with masters courses in 60 departments in 15 interdisciplinary programs, and doctoral courses in 56 departments and 12 interdisciplinary programs. In addition, there are eight research institutes.

Divisions & Department

College of Humanities and Social Sciences 
The College of Humanities and Social Sciences aims to teach and study various advanced theories and practices of humanities, society, and design areas to nurture like-minded intellectuals. These may include volunteers who wish to work with justice and do creative design work in various areas such as law, politics, economics, and the media. The college teaches people to be the center of our society, possessing the international minds to lead knowledge and information society.

 Department of Korean Language and Literature
 Division of English Language and Literature
 Division of Japanese Language and Literature
 Department of History
 Division of Economics
 Department of Law
 Department of Public Administration
 Division of International and Area Studies
 Department of Mass Communication
 Department of Political Science and Diplomacy
 Department of Early Childhood Education
 Department of Fashion Design

College of Information Convergence 
The College of Information Convergence is one of the most active college within Korea through its achievement of recognizable results in assisting various national businesses and its undertaking of major research activities. This college plans to lead the futuristic national industrial plans for the upcoming 4th Industrial Revolution. The college itself was made by integrating Engineering divisions and Social Sciences' divisions.

 Division of Data Science and Information
 Division of Media Communication
 Division of Smart Health-care
 Division of Electro-Telecommunication
 Division of Figurative Arts
 Division of Computer Engineering

College of Business Administration 
College of Business Administration (C&BA) aims to teach and study current theory and practical method in the areas of management, finance accounting, tourism and international commerce.

 Division of Business Administration
 Division of International Commerce

College of Undeclared and Exploratory Majors
The unique Undeclared and Exploratory Major division (UEM) at PKNU offers freedom to choose majors among all the offered programs at PKNU which includes colleges of Humanities and Social Sciences, Natural Sciences, Business Administration, Engineering, Fisheries Sciences, Environmental and Marine Sciences and Technology. Furthermore, students who enroll in the UEM will gain priority access to PKNU's diverse international programs such as international exchange programs, short-term foreign language programs, and international internship programs. 

In the 1st year, students will be enrolled in a specialized program which combines variety of intensive English course, general electives, and core courses that will help them to settle down to university life. Major selection seminars will be held during the 2nd semester where helpful information about most of the majors offered at PKNU will be provided. Also, six highly qualified faculty members from variety of disciplines will be always available to guide students to the right major of their choice.
 Division of Undeclared and Exploratory Majors

College of Fisheries Science 
The College of Fisheries Sciences has long been a driving force for advancing the fisheries and aquaculture sciences since its establishment in 1941. Over the years, the college has facilitated utilization and distribution of the knowledge of Fisheries Sciences. The College of Fisheries Sciences cultivates global leaders of fisheries sciences who will contribute to the advance in fisheries sciences through researches and theoretical, technological studies, covering the whole range of fisheries sciences. Individual studies include the production and management of aquatic life resources, the efficient and highly valued utilization of aquatic organisms, the fisheries education, and the marine industry policy.

Moreover, the College of Fisheries Sciences is concerned with wiser management of fish and shellfish stocks for the future ecological relationships between aquatic organisms and their environments, culture of aquatic plants and animals, impacts of human population pressures on the aquatic environment, and development of new seafood products. Both undergraduate and graduate degrees are offered.
 Division of Food Science
 Division of Marine Production System Management 
 Division of Marine & Fisheries Business and Economics
 Department of Aquatic Life Medicine
 Department of Marine & Fisheries Industry and Education
 Division of Marine Biology and Science

College of Environmental and Marine Science & Technology 
College of Environmental and Marine Science and Technology was founded to enhance research and education in the fields of marine and environmental science and technology, To this end the college facilitates the search for understanding the Earth's environment, the ocean, the atmosphere and the solid earth, the exploration of marine resources and the conservation and control of marine space and environment.
 Division of Earth & Environment System Sciences
 Department of Energy Resources Engineering
 Department of Ocean Engineering

College of Engineering 
College of Engineering was established as the result of a merger between Pusan National University of Technology and the National Fisheries University of Busan, both of which were national universities offered four-year programs. The college has 12,000 domestic and foreign students in total.

For research and education facilities, there are 5 research centers: a complex practical center of engineering in the Engineering Research Center, the Engineering Education Innovative Center and Women’s Engineering Education Leading Business Team, all of which are leading innovative education in engineering.
 Department of Industrial and Data Engineering
 Division of Electrical Engineering
 Division of Mechanical Engineering
 Division of Energy Transportation System Engineering
 Department of Chemical Engineering
 Division of Industrial Chemistry and Polymer Engineering
 Division of Nanotechnology Convergence Engineering
 Division of Systems Management and Safety Engineering
 Department of Fire Department Engineering
 Division of Convergence Material Engineering
 Department of Architecture
 Division of Sustainable Material Engineering

College of Natural Science 
The College of Natural Science has the educational goal of teaching practical usage of Applied Mathematics, Statistics, Physics, Chemistry, Microbiology, Nursing, Marine sports, etc, and teaches the primary theory of Natural Science and Applied Science in research.

 Department of Applied Mathematics
 Department of Chemistry
 Department of Nursing
 Department of Physics
 Department of Microbiology
 Department of Science System Simulation

Campus 
Pukyong National University occupies two Busan-based campuses: the Daeyeon Campus is situated in 23 Yongso-ro, Nam-gu; and the Yongdang Campus is in Yongdang-dong, Nam-gu.

Location
Daeyeon Campus, the main campus, is located in the southern part of Busan. It is served by its own subway station on Line 2. Yongdang Campus, the engineering campus used to be, is on Yongdang-dong, Busan. The engineering campus moved to Daeyeon in 2019, but some research facilities still remain in Yongdang.
There used to be Mutgol Campus in the 1990s, but sold to Nam-gu because of the construction of the new city hall.

Facilities

Museum 

PKNU museum is located on the first and second floors of the Cheongun Building. It has the largest collection of materials in the field of fisheries and marine studies among the universities in South Korea. There are 2,278 exhibits including 1,262 cultural properties, 374 marine organisms, 287 items of fishing equipment and fishing boats, 55 vessels, 283 historical materials related to PKNU, and 17 folk materials. Also, there are many exhibits of historical value including a chanfron from the Gaya period, thought to be the earliest chanfron, and armor which was excavated from Dugok Historical Site in Gimhae. In addition, there are many stuffed marine organisms, including a coelacanth, one of only two in Korea. There is also a bone of the southern right whale, giant clam, various sharks, fish which inhabit the coastal waters and the ocean, crustaceans, and sea animals.

The lobby of the Cheongun building contains a Pukyongosaurus Millenniumi, a herbivorous dinosaur which lived in the Korean Peninsula about 140 million years ago, and the first dinosaur to have a Korean name. Its fossil was discovered on the small rocky island located on the coast of Galsa-ri, Geumseong-myeon, Hadong-gun, Gyeongsangnam-do, and restored by a team led by PKNU professor Baek In Seong.

Libraries 

Pukyong National University Library has been reorganized in Daeyeon Campus to suit the function of the campus. Daeyeon Campus has Central library and Academic Information Library, and Yongdang Campus has Engineering library, respectively. In the Central library, there is a studying space restricted access to outsiders, and the access is only possible with a student ID card. In addition, most services such as searching for collection materials, providing original texts, searching for materials from other institutions, and applying for copying are provided on the library's website.

Daeyeon Campus has a 24-hour reading room called "Miraero," where students can study freely study.

Busan Radiological Monitoring Station 
The Busan Radiological Monitoring Station is one of 12 supervisory organizations in the country which have been operated by the Korea Institute of Nuclear Safety (KINS) since 1967 to observe the level of radiation in the atmosphere. It provides the information needed to prepare appropriate countermeasures and prevent atomic accidents in Busan and Gyeongsangnam-do.

Notable people and alumni 
Heize, singer
Jea-Chul Kim, founder of Dong-won Group

Harukasan software mirror 
The Harukasan Mirror Station has been hosted by Pukyong National University since 2016. The archive hosts Arch, Debian, and Ubuntu Linux builds in addition to other open-source software.

See also
List of national universities in South Korea
List of universities and colleges in South Korea
Education in Korea

References

External links 
Pukyong National University (Korean)
Pukyong National University (English)

Universities and colleges in Busan
National universities and colleges in South Korea
Venues of the 2002 Asian Games
1996 establishments in South Korea
Educational institutions established in 1996